10x10 is a posthumous solo album by Ronnie Montrose. Ronnie had been touring with bassist Ricky Phillips (Styx, The Babys) and Eric Singer (Kiss) in the early 2000s. Over three days in 2003 at Doug Messenger's studio in North Hollywood, the sessions produced 10 strong tracks of rhythm guitar, bass and drums with the intention to get a singer to for the vocals. Eventually Ronnie decided on the 10x10 concept, 10 tracks and 10 different singers. Early on, he was able to secure contributions from close friends and collaborators like Sammy Hagar, Edgar Winter and Davey Pattison. In the intervening years Ronnie battled prostate cancer and, at one point, hadn't touched a guitar for 2 years. 
Conflicts in scheduling led to the record remaining unfinished for years up until Montrose's passing in 2012. Along with completion of the vocals, the songs also needed lead guitar as well. Rickey Phillips, with the blessing of Ronnie's wife Leighsa and assistance of Eric Singer, picked up the reigns and completed the album. "After he passed, I had to carry on with what Ronnie wanted, because he was such a purist. The songs were cut to 2-inch tape and then transferred to digital, but I really needed it to be a cohesive record. I've done enough records to know how easily the levels of 10 different singers can sound disjointed if you don't stay on top of the production."
As per Singer, "I have to give a lot of credit to Ricky Phillips. Ricky really wanted to see this thing through. It was more for Ronnie than just for himself, or for ourselves. We really believed what we had originally captured had a certain vibe and a certain magic to the people in that room when it was created. We felt like, 'Hey, this thing needs to get done. We need to see this thing through, for every good reason.'"

Track listing 

 "Heavy Traffic" (Montrose/Martin/Pressis/Phillips)
 "Love Is An Art" (Montrose/Winter)
 "Color Blind" (Montrose/Hagar)
 "Still Singin' With The Band" (Montrose/Phillips/Mensinger)
 "Strong Enough" (Montrose/Phillips/Shaw/Mensinger)
 "Any Minute" (Montrose/Farner)
 "The Kingdom's Come Undone" (Montrose/Phillips)
 "One Good Reason" (Montrose/Turgon)
 "Head On Straight" (Montrose/Phillips/Mensinger)
 "I'm Not Lying" (Montrose/Phillips/Rolie)

Personnel
On all tracks
Ronnie Montrose - main guitar
Ricky Phillips - bass
Eric Singer - drums

Additional personnel
Heavy Traffic	
Eric Martin- lead and backing vocals	
Dave Meniketti - guitar solo
Ed Roth - organ and piano
J'nae Fincannon and Debby Holiday - backing vocals
	
Love Is An Art
Edgar Winter - lead and harmony vocals, Hammond organ, saxophone
Rick Derringer - guitar solo
Ricky Phillips - synth bass, tambourine and percussion
 
Color Blind
Sammy Hagar - lead vocals
Steve Lukather - guitar solo
Ricky Phillips - Hammond organ, Wurlitzer electric piano, harmony guitars and backing vocals
J'nae Fincannon, Debby Holiday and Jeff Scott Soto - backing vocals
Todd Sucherman - percussion
 
Still Singin' With The Band
Glenn Hughes - lead  and backing vocals
Phil Collen - guitar solo
Jimmy "Z" Zavala - harmonica
Ricky Phillips - Hammond organ and backing vocals
Jeff Scott Soto - backing vocals
 
Strong Enough
Tommy Shaw - lead and backing vocals, slide guitar solo, electric & high strung guitars
Ricky Phillips - atmospheric synth, keys, percussion and backing vocals
Ed Roth - organ and piano
Todd Sucherman - percussion
 
Any Minute 
Mark Farner - lead and backing vocals, guitar solo
Ricky Phillips - Hammond organ and backing vocals
J'nae Fincannon and Debby Holiday - backing vocals
Jimmy "Z" Zavala - harmonica

The Kingdom's Come Undone 
Ricky Phillips - lead and backing vocals, harmony guitars and Hammond organ
Joe Bonamassa - guitar solo
Ed Roth  - keyboards

One Good Reason
Bruce Turgon - lead and vocals
Brad Whitford - guitar solo
Ricky Phillips - percussion, Hammond organ from guitar solo out
Ed Roth - Hammond organ

Head On Straight
Davey Pattison - lead vocals
Marc Bonilla - guitar solo
Ricky Phillips - Hammond organ, backing vocals
Bruce Turgon -  backing vocals
 
I'm Not Lying
Gregg Rolie - lead and backing vocals, synth and keyboards
Tom Gimbel - saxophone
Ricky Phillips - 12 string guitar, acoustic guitar, Hammond organ, coda arrangement, percussion and backing vocals
Todd Sucherman - percussion
Jeff Scott Soto and Debby Holiday - backing vocals
Lawrence Gowan -  piano

References

2017 albums
Ronnie Montrose albums